Penjapyx is a genus of diplurans in the family Japygidae.

Species
 Penjapyx altus Smith, 1962
 Penjapyx castrii González & Smith, 1964

References

Diplura